Fatma Danabaş (born 28 January 1983) is a Turkish Paralympian archer competing in the Women's compound bow W1 event.
She is competing at the 2020 Summer Paralympics in the individual W1 and Mixed team W1 events.

She took the first place in the Mized Team W1 event with her teammaye Bahattin Hekimoğlu at the 7th Fazza Para Archery World Ranking Tournament in Dubai, United Arab Emirates in 2021.

At the 2022 World Para Archery Championships in Dubai, United Arab Emirates, she won the silver medal in the Women W1 Doubles event together with her teammate Nil Mısır.

References

1983 births
Living people
Turkish female archers
Paralympic archers of Turkey
Wheelchair category Paralympic competitors
Archers at the 2020 Summer Paralympics
21st-century Turkish sportswomen
Islamic Solidarity Games medalists in archery